Chema is a common nickname for the Spanish given name José María (an alternative to the short form José Mari), and less commonly for José Manuel (or Josema).

People 
The name Chema may refer to:

 Chema (footballer born 1976), Spanish football midfielder, real name José Manuel Jiménez Sancho
 Chema (footballer born 1980), Spanish football goalkeeper, real name José María Giménez Pérez
 Chema (footballer, born 1992), Spanish football defender, real name José Manuel Rodríguez Benito
 Chema (footballer, born 1997), Spanish football midfielder, real name José Manuel Núñez Martín
 Chema Madoz, Spanish photographer, real name Jose Maria Rodriguez Madoz
 Chema Martínez, Spanish long-distance runner, real name José Manuel Martínez Fernández
 Chema Mato, Spanish football midfielder, real name José María Mato Nieto
 Chema Rodríguez (filmmaker) (born 1967), Spanish filmmaker and writer
 Chema Rodríguez (handballer) (born 1980), Spanish handball player
 El Chema (character), fictional character in television series, full name José María Venegas
 El Chema, television series based on the life of the above character
 José María Antón, Spanish football defender
 José María Torre, Mexican actor
 Thomas V. Chema, American academic administrator and lawyer

Txema 
Txema, a Basque spelling variant of the name also exists, and may refer to:
Txema Alonso, Spanish football defender, real name José María Alonso Fernández
Txema Añibarro, Spanish football midfielder, real name José María Añibarro Astondoa
Txema del Olmo, Spanish cyclist, full name José María del Olmo Zendegi
Txema Garcia, Spanish/Andorran football defender, real name José Manuel García Luena
Txema Guijarro García, Spanish politician, full name José María Guijarro García
Txema Noriega, Spanish football forward, full name José María Noriega Aldekoa

Places 
 Chema, Tibet, a village in the Chumbi Valley, Yadong County of Tibet